Michael Ian Olmo (born March 25, 1999), known professionally as Iann Dior (stylized in all lowercase), is an American rapper and singer. He is most notably well-known for his 2020 hit single "Mood", a collaboration with 24kGoldn. The song peaked at number one on the Billboard Hot 100 and became his first and highest-charting song to date.

Early life
Olmo was born on March 25, 1999, in Arecibo, Puerto Rico to Tommy and Anabelle Olmo. He graduated high school in May 2017. Growing up, Olmo listened mostly to rap, and through his mother, some Spanish music, including Marc Anthony. He recalls how his father would listen to Jay-Z and introduce him to rock bands such as The Fray.

Career

2019: Career beginnings and Industry Plant
Fired from a job at United Parcel Service in 2019, Olmo started recording his songs on SoundCloud. Olmo's first song was "cutthroat", which has been played over 5 million times. He subsequently released 7 other songs, one of which was "emotions". Although it failed to chart, "emotions" has gone on to become Olmo's second most popular and most streamed song to date. These 8 songs would make up his debut mixtape nothings ever good enough, released on May 22, 2019. 

Soon after, Olmo began working on his debut studio album Industry Plant. He released "what is real" on July 3, the album's lead single. The next day, he released "gone girl" featuring Trippie Redd, the album's second single. Although it did not chart on the US Billboard Hot 100, it peaked at number 13 on the Official New Zealand Music Chart, becoming his third most popular song to date. On October 25, he released the third single, "Strings" featuring Gunna. Industry Plant was published on November 8, peaking at number 44 on the US Billboard 200.

2020: Breakthrough and rise to fame
Olmo started off 2020 by releasing "Good Day" on January 24; the first single for his upcoming extended play I'm Gone. It charted at number 33 on the Official New Zealand Music Chart. On April 17, Olmo released the pop-punk track "Sick and Tired" featuring Machine Gun Kelly and Travis Barker, the EP's second single. This was a notable change of style by Olmo, with previous releases being mainly trap and emo rap. Although it did not chart on the US Billboard Hot 100, it did peak at number 15 on the US Bubbling Under Hot 100 Singles, as well as number 3 the US Hot Rock & Alternative Songs. It also charted at number 9 on the Official New Zealand Music Chart. Olmo released the EP's third single, "Prospect" featuring Lil Baby on May 22. Although again not charting on the US Billboard Hot 100, "Prospect" peaked at number 8 on the US Bubbling Under Hot 100 Singles, number 50 on the US Hot R&B/Hip-Hop Songs, and number 27 on the Official New Zealand Music Chart. I'm Gone was published on June 12, peaking at number 45 on the US Billboard 200. 

The biggest breakthrough in Olmo's career came on July 24 when he was featured on the pop rap single "Mood" by fellow American rapper 24kGoldn. The song became a commercial success after earning popularity on the video-sharing app TikTok. It peaked at number 1 on the US Billboard Hot 100, where it spent eight non-consecutive weeks, and also topped the charts in the United Kingdom, Australia, Ireland, Austria, Denmark, the Netherlands, Norway, and Sweden. To date, "Mood" has amassed over 1.35 billion Spotify streams and 326 million views on its official music video. On August 27, Olmo collaborated with record producer Internet Money, as well as Lil Mosey and Lil Skies, on "Lost Me", a song off Internet Money's debut studio album B4 the Storm. The song reached number 28 on the Official New Zealand Music Chart. Olmo was then featured on the track "nothing inside" from Machine Gun Kelly's pop-punk album Tickets To My Downfall, on September 25. "nothing inside" peaked at number 20 on the US Hot Rock & Alternative Songs. This follows the success of their previous collaboration on "Sick and Tired". On October 21, Olmo collborated with American TikTok personality and singer Jxdn on "Tonight", the third single from Jxdn's debut studio album Tell Me About Tomorrow. "Tonight" charted at number 29 on the US Hot Rock & Alternative Songs. On October 30, Olmo was featured on "Like Me" from $NOT's second album Beautiful Havoc. A remix of "Mood" was released on November 6, featuring singers Justin Bieber and J Balvin. To end off 2020, Olmo released a non-album single "Holding On" on November 20, coming in at number 14 on the Official New Zealand Music Chart.

2021–present: On to Better Things
On January 29, Olmo was the lead vocalist for the single "Higher" by British electronic music group Clean Bandit. Although not charting on the US Billboard Hot 100, the song peaked at number 67 on the Irish Singles Chart and number 66 on the UK Singles Chart. He then collaborated with American DJ and record producer Illenium on another single "First Time" on March 12, from Illenium's fourth studio album Fallen Embers. Although again not reaching the US Billboard Hot 100, "First Time" charted at number 23 on the US Hot Rock & Alternative Songs and number 21 on the Official New Zealand Music Chart. Two weeks later, Olmo was featured on the remix of the 2020 hit song "Heat Waves" by British indie rock band Glass Animals. On April 16, Olmo released the 2-track EP Still Here, containing "shots in the dark" featuring Trippie Redd, and "don't wanna believe". Both songs managed to chart on the Official New Zealand Music Chart, coming in at number 8 and number 34 respectively, while "shots in the dark" also peaked at number 81 on the Canadian Hot 100. In addition, "shots in the dark" served as a follow-up to the two artists' previous collaboration, "gone girl" in 2019. On August 27, Olmo was featured on the track "Seaside" from Lil Tecca's second studio album We Love You Tecca 2. It charted at number 38 on the Official New Zealand Music Chart. Olmo released his highly anticipated single "V12" featuring Lil Uzi Vert on September 14, the lead single for his second studio album On to Better Things. "V12" peaked at number 20 on the US Bubbling Under Hot 100 Singles as well as number 22 on the Official New Zealand Music Chart. The album's second single, "Let You", was released on November 12, reaching number 18 on the Official New Zealand Music Chart. 

Olmo's first single of 2022 came on January 18; he released "Thought It Was" featuring previous collaborators Machine Gun Kelly and Travis Barker, as the album's third single. This came three days before the album's release on January 21. With this album, he experimented with "smooth pop-punk beats and rap-rock crossovers", working with Barker and Taz Taylor, among others. He described the album as more "personal" than his previous, and also directed his own music videos. Throughout 2022, Olmo will embark on the Better Things Tour.

Discography

Studio albums

Extended plays

Mixtapes

Compilations

Singles

As lead artist

As featured artist

Other charted and certified songs

Guest appearances

Collaborative

Filmography

Audio

Tours 

Headlining
 Better Things Tour (2022)

Supporting
 Mainstream Sellout Tour (2022)

Notes

References

1999 births
21st-century American male musicians
Emo rap musicians
Living people
Puerto Rican rappers
People from Arecibo, Puerto Rico
People from Corpus Christi, Texas
Rappers from Texas
Pop rappers